Pepin (also spelled Pippin, April 777 – 8 July 810), born  Carloman, was the son of Charlemagne and King of Italy (781–810) under the authority of his father.

Pepin was the second son of Charlemagne by his then-wife Hildegard. He was born Carloman, but was rechristened with the royal name Pepin (also the name of his older half-brother Pepin the Hunchback, and his grandfather King Pepin the Younger) when he was a young child. He was made "king of Italy" after his father's conquest of the Lombards, in 781, and crowned by Pope Hadrian I with the Iron Crown of Lombardy.

Pepin was active as ruler of Italy and worked to expand the Frankish empire. In 791, he marched a Lombard army into the Drava valley and ravaged Pannonia, while his father marched along the Danube into Avar territory. Charlemagne left the campaigning to deal with a Saxon revolt in 792. Pepin and Duke Eric of Friuli continued, however, to assault the Avars' ring-shaped strongholds. The great Ring of the Avars, their capital fortress, was taken twice. The spoils were sent to Charlemagne in Aachen and redistributed to all his followers and even to foreign rulers, including King Offa of Mercia. A celebratory poem, De Pippini regis Victoria Avarica, was composed after Pepin forced the Avar khagan to submit in 796. This poem was composed at Verona, Pepin's capital after 799 and the centre of Carolingian Renaissance literature in Italy. The Versus de Verona (c. 800), an urban encomium of the city, likewise praises king Pepin. The Historia Langobardorum codicis Gothani hails Pepin's campaign against Benevento and his liberation of Corsica "from the oppression of the Moors."

His activities included a long, but unsuccessful siege of Venice in 810. The siege lasted six months and Pepin's army was ravaged by the diseases of the local swamps and was forced to withdraw. A few months later Pepin died, on 8 July 810.

Family 
The issue of Pepin's relationships is not entirely clear. A litany of Liber confrater augiensis attributes to him as his wife a certain Chrotais (or Ruadheid), married shortly before 796,. However, the Vita Hludowici written by Thegan of Trier around 840 says that King Bernard of Italy was born of a concubine (ex concubina natus), an affirmation reinforced by a litany of St. Gallen placing Bernard in a list of Carolingians of illegitimate birth.

We do not know the origin of Chrotais but her name, that of Bernard of Italy and the fact that Adalard of Corbie and his half-brother Wala are then the protectors of Bernard of Italy suggests a close relationship between Chrotais and these. This hypothesis is reinforced by the fact that the first names of Bernard, Gundrada and Theodrada are found in the brothers and sisters of Wala and Adalard. Only, it is chronologically improbable that Chrotais is daughter of Wala, impossible that it is daughter of a brother or sister of Wala, who were too young, and the Vita Adalhardiis formal about the fact that Bernard had only five children. It remains as an explanation that the wife of Pepin is a grand-niece of his namesake, the third wife of Charles Martel.

Besides his son Bernard, Pepin had five daughters: Adelaide, who married Lambert I of Nantes; Atala; Gundrada; Bertha; and Tetrada, who married Adelaide's stepson, Lambert II of Nantes. All of whom but the eldest were born between 800 and Pepin's death. All except Adelaide and Tetrada died before their grandfather's death in 814. Pepin was expected to inherit a third of his father's empire, but he predeceased him. The Lombard crown passed on to his illegitimate son Bernard, but the empire went to Pepin's younger brother, Louis the Pious.

Notes 

777 births
810 deaths
8th-century kings of Italy
9th-century kings of Italy
Monarchs of the Carolingian Empire
Frankish warriors
9th-century Frankish monarchs
Children of Charlemagne
8th-century Frankish kings
Sons of emperors